Mathieu Demy (born 15 October 1972) is a French actor, film director and producer.

He is the son of French film directors Agnès Varda and Jacques Demy.

Career
Demy started as a young actor in Agnès Varda's films L'une chante, l'autre pas (One Sings, the Other Doesn't), Documenteur, Mur Murs and Kung Fu Master.

Demy's work as an actor ranges from romantic comedy to drama. His breakthrough came in 1998, when he was cast as Olivier, a young man with AIDS, in the musical Jeanne et le Garçon formidable, directed by Olivier Ducastel and Jacques Martineau.

In 1999, he started a company, Les Films de l’Autre, to produce his own short films. He produced and directed in 2000 his first film, Le Plafond (35’), adapted from a short story by Tonino Benacquista. The film received the audience award at the Angers film festival Festival Premiers Plans and the Uppsala International Short film Festival, and additional awards in Pantin, Rennes, Dignes and Mamers.

In 2001, Demy worked for director Benoît Cohen for the first time in the film Les Acteurs anonymes. They reunited for Nos enfants chéris (Our Precious Children), in which he played Martin, a 30-year-old who meets his great love again just as he's about to become a father.

In 2001, Demy received the best actor award at the Festival de Paris for Quand on sera grand directed by Renaud Cohen. The Festival Européen Cinessone awarded him twice for acting: in 2003 for Mister V. by Émilie Deleuze and in 2004 for Le Silence by Orso Miret.

In 2005, Les Films de l’Autre produced Demy’s second short film, La Bourde (20’), an experimental comedy.

Demy reprised his role as Martin for the TV adaptation of Nos enfants chéris, which aired on Canal+ in 2007-2008. He was cast by Pascal Bonitzer for Le Grand Alibi and worked twice for Philippe Barassat, in Folle de Rachid en transit sur Mars and in Lisa et le pilote d’avion. In 2009, he also starred in André Téchiné's La Fille du RER and in the television drama Mes chères études, directed by Emmanuelle Bercot and dealing with a students' prostitution.

In 2011, Demy appeared in  Céline Sciamma's Tomboy and was cast as the lead in the romantic comedy L'Art de séduire by Guy Mazarguil.

The same year, Demy wrote, directed and produced his first feature film, Americano. Demy also stars in the film along with Salma Hayek and Geraldine Chaplin.

Since 2012 Demy has continued to act in films such as "Les Conquerants" by Xabi Molia or "My little One" by Frédéric Choffat and Julie Gilbert. 
Demy has also been involved in French television shows such as Eric ROchant's multi-awarded "Le Bureau des Légendes" for which he directed two episodes in season 1 and 3 episodes in season 3. Demy also had a part in the show as "Clément Migaud", Marie-Jeanne's lover

Since 2019 Demy stars in "Mytho" along with Marina Hands. The show was created by Anne Berest and Fabrice Gobert ("Les revenants") and was broadcast on Arte, whetre it gathered 2 million views, and available on Netflix for the international audience. 
The shooting of season 2 will be stating at the end of January 2020.

Filmography
1977 : One Sings, the Other Doesn't
1981 : Documenteur
1988 : Kung-Fu Master
1993 : À la belle étoile with Julie Gayet, Chiara Mastroianni
1995 : A Hundred and One Nights
1997 : Arlette with Josiane Balasko and Christopher Lambert
1997 : Jeanne et le garçon formidable with Virginie Ledoyen
1999 : Le New Yorker with Grace Phillips
1999 : Banqueroute with Antoine Chappey
2000 : La Chambre obscure with Caroline Ducey, Melvil Poupaud
2001 : Dieu est grand, je suis toute petite with Audrey Tautou
2002 : Aram by Robert Kechichian with Simon Abkarian, Lubna Azabal
2003 : Nos enfants chéris by Benoît Cohen
2005 :  by Michel Deville with Emmanuelle Béart, Charles Berling
2006 : Quelques jours en septembre by Santiago Amigorena
2007 : Écoute le temps by Alantė Kavaitė
2007 : Le Temps d'un regard by Ilan Flammer
2008 : Le Grand alibi by Pascal Bonitzer
2008 : Les Plages d'Agnès by Agnès Varda
2009 : La Fille du RER by André Téchiné
2011 : Les Insomniaques by Jean-Pierre Mocky
2011 : L'Art de séduire by Guy Mazarguil
2011 : Tomboy by Céline Sciamma
2011 : Americano, directorial debut
2013 : The Conquerors by Xabi Molia
2015 : Séances by Guy Maddin
2016 - 2018 : Le Bureau des Légendes by Eric Rochant
2018 : My Little One by Julie Gilbert & Frédéric Choffat
2019 - 2020 : Mytho by Fabrice Gobert & Anne Berest

References

External links

1972 births
Living people
French male film actors
French film directors
French people of Greek descent
Male actors from Paris